The 2nd East Anglian Division was a 2nd Line Territorial Force division of the British Army in World War I.  The division was formed as a duplicate of the 54th (East Anglian) Division in November 1914. As the name suggests, the division recruited in East Anglia, particularly Essex, Norfolk, and Suffolk, but also Bedfordshire, Cambridgeshire, Hertfordshire, and Northamptonshire.  In August 1915, in common with all Territorial Force divisions, it was numbered as 69th (2nd East Anglian) Division.  By January 1918 it had been extensively reorganized and lost its territorial identity; henceforth it was known as 69th Division.

It served on home defence duties throughout the war, whilst recruiting, training and supplying drafts to overseas units and formations.  Initially, it was stationed in East Anglia, but from June 1916 it was in Northern Command.  It never left England and was eventually disbanded in March 1919.

History
In accordance with the Territorial and Reserve Forces Act 1907 (7 Edw.7, c.9) which brought the Territorial Force into being, the TF was intended to be a home defence force for service during wartime and members could not be compelled to serve outside the country. However, on the outbreak of war on 4 August 1914, many members volunteered for Imperial Service.  Therefore, TF units were split into 1st Line (liable for overseas service) and 2nd Line (home service for those unable or unwilling to serve overseas) units.  2nd Line units performed the home defence role, although in fact most of these were also posted abroad in due course.

On 15 August 1915, TF units were instructed to separate home service men from those who had volunteered for overseas service (1st Line), with the home service personnel to be formed into reserve units (2nd Line).  On 31 August, 2nd Line units were authorized for each 1st Line unit where more than 60% of men had volunteered for overseas service.  After being organized, armed and clothed, the 2nd Line units were gradually grouped into large formations thereby forming the 2nd Line divisions.  These 2nd Line units and formations had the same name and structure as their 1st Line parents.  On 24 November, it was decided to replace imperial service (1st Line) formations as they proceeded overseas with their reserve (2nd Line) formations.  A second reserve (3rd Line) unit was then formed at the peace headquarters of the 1st Line.

As a result, the 2nd East Anglian Division was formed in November 1914 with the 2nd Essex, 2nd East Midland and 2nd Norfolk and Suffolk Brigades as a 2nd Line duplicate of the East Anglian Division.

Order of battle

Commanders
The 69th (2nd East Anglian) Division had the following commanders:

See also

 54th (East Anglian) Division for the 1st Line formation
 List of British divisions in World War I

Notes

References

Bibliography

External links

Infantry divisions of the British Army in World War I
Military units and formations established in 1914
Military units and formations disestablished in 1919
1914 establishments in the United Kingdom